Coventry South East was a parliamentary constituency in the city of Coventry.  It returned one Member of Parliament (MP)  to the House of Commons of the Parliament of the United Kingdom.

The constituency was created for the February 1974 general election, and abolished for the 1997 general election.

Boundaries
1974–1983: The County Borough of Coventry wards of Binley and Willenhall, Godiva, Lower Stoke, and St Michael's.

1983–1997: The City of Coventry wards of Binley and Willenhall, Cheylesmore, Lower Stoke, and St Michael's.

For its entire existence the constituency included Coventry city centre, which had previously been part of the Coventry South seat; in 1997 the city centre was transferred to the re-created Coventry South constituency, with Jim Cunningham being elected as MP.

Members of Parliament

Elections

Elections in the 1970s

Elections in the 1980s

Elections in the 1990s

Notes and references 

Parliamentary constituencies in Coventry
Parliamentary constituencies in the West Midlands (county) (historic)
Constituencies of the Parliament of the United Kingdom established in 1974
Constituencies of the Parliament of the United Kingdom disestablished in 1997